Forest Gate railway station is on the Great Eastern Main Line serving Forest Gate in the London Borough of Newham, east London. Its three-letter station code is FOG and it is in fare zone 3.

The station was opened in 1840 by the Eastern Counties Railway.

History

Forest Gate station first opened in 1840 by the Eastern Counties Railway, a year after the line was built, but was closed in 1843, before re-opening on 31 May 1846 following pressure from local residents.

Accidents and incidents 
On 24 May 1953, at around 4 a.m., three members of train crew were injured in a collision between a freight train and a staff train that occurred east of Forest Gate station. A London-bound freight train that had started out at the  goods yard was crossing from the electric line over to the main line when a staff train bound for the  sidings passed a signal at danger and collided with the goods train at a speed of about 35 mph. A Ministry of Transport and Civil Aviation report blamed the driver of the Gidea Park train for his failure to "pay attention to signals".

Crossrail improvements
Other enhancements included three new lifts providing access to all platforms, improved lighting and signage, help points, and new ticket machines and gates within a refurbished ticket hall.

Location

London Buses routes 58, 308 and 330 serve the station.

Services
All services from Forest Gate are operated by Elizabeth Line.

 8 tph to Paddington
 8 tph to Shenfield

References

External links

 Excel file displaying National Rail station usage information for 2005/06 

Railway stations in the London Borough of Newham
Former Great Eastern Railway stations
Railway stations in Great Britain opened in 1840
Railway stations in Great Britain closed in 1843
Railway stations in Great Britain opened in 1846
Railway stations served by the Elizabeth line
Railway station
Stratford, London